The First Siege of Missolonghi  was an attempt by Ottoman forces to capture the strategically located port town of Missolonghi during the early stages of the Greek War of Independence.

Siege
After the battle of Peta and the fall of Suli, the road to Missolonghi for the Ottomans was clear. An Ottoman force of 11,000 troops, led by Omer Vrioni and Reşid Mehmed Pasha, alongside part of the Ottoman fleet led by Yussuf Pasha of Patras sieged the town on 25 October 1822. Inside the fortified town, there was Alexandros Mavrokordatos, Markos Botsaris, Athanasios Razi-Kotsikas and around six hundred men with fourteen guns. The food and ammunition they possessed would last for only a month. The Ottomans could easily take the city with an attack, although they preferred making negotiations with the besieged Greeks. The Greeks took advantage of this, dragging the negotiations out until the reinforcements from the south arrived. In November, the Greek fleet arrived and targeted the Ottoman ships. More than 1,000 soldiers with food disembarked, relieving the besieged Greeks who subsequently ceased the negotiations. Upon realising their mistake, the Ottomans resumed the siege in earnest. 

After a month of bombardment and sorties, the main Ottoman assault was set for the night of 24 December, before Christmas, expecting that the Greeks would be caught by surprise. Unknown to the Ottomans, the Greeks were warned by Vryonis' Greek secretary, allowing them to make preparations and causing the Ottomans to lose the element of surprise. In the upcoming conflict the Ottomans were defeated and the siege was subsequently lifted on December 31. The Ottoman army, while retreating, passed through the flooded Achelous River where more than five hundred men drowned.

Aftermath
Missolonghi remained under Greek control, and resisted another Ottoman attempt at its capture a year later. Its resistance achieved wider fame when Lord Byron arrived there, dying in the town of fever in April 1824. The city was besieged for a third and final time, resisting both Ottoman and Egyptian armies for almost a year, until its final fall on 10 April 1826.

See also
 Dimitrios Deligeorgis, a battery commander during the first siege
 Second Siege of Missolonghi
 Third Siege of Missolonghi

References

Missolonghi 1822
Conflicts in 1822
1822 in Greece
Missolonghi
History of Aetolia-Acarnania
October 1822 events
November 1822 events
December 1822 events
Central Greece in the Greek War of Independence